Kohlhiesel's Daughters is a 1930 German comedy film directed by Hans Behrendt and starring Henny Porten, Fritz Kampers, and Leo Peukert. It is an adaptation of the play Kohlhiesel's Daughters by Hanns Kräly, which has been made into a number of films. The film was a significant success at the box office, establishing the silent actress Porten as a sound star. Porten plays the role of twin sisters, one of whom is vivacious and the other unpleasant.

It was shot at the Babelsberg Studios in Berlin. The film's sets were designed by the art director Franz Schroedter.

Cast
Henny Porten as Liesel & Gretel, Kohlhiesel's daughter
Fritz Kampers as Pepi
Leo Peukert as Kohlhiesel
Heinz-Leo Fischer as Toni
Franz Groß as Uncle Xaver
Karl Harbacher as Seppl, head waiter
Gustl Gstettenbaur as Gustl, boy waiter

References

External links

1930 comedy films
German comedy films
Films of the Weimar Republic
Films directed by Hans Behrendt
Films set in Bavaria
Films set in the Alps
German black-and-white films
German films based on plays
Remakes of German films
Sound film remakes of silent films
Films produced by Seymour Nebenzal
1930s German films
Films shot at Babelsberg Studios